Microstonyx was an extinct genus of suid that existed during the Miocene in Asia and Europe.

References

Prehistoric Suidae
Miocene mammals of Africa
Miocene even-toed ungulates
Fossil taxa described in 1926
Prehistoric even-toed ungulate genera